Matthew Andongcho Mbuta (born 21 December 1985) is a Cameroonian professional footballer who plays as an attacking midfielder for Iraq Division One club Duhok SC.

Career

Africa and Asia
Mbuta began his career with PWD Bamenda of the Cameroon Première Division. In his first season with the club he striker scored 12 goals in 20 appearances, and emerged as the third best player of the championship. Thanks to his play, PWD qualified for the CAF Cup, where the club reached the quarterfinal stage, with Mbuta netting five goals in four continental matches.

In 2006 Mbuta signed with Brunei DPMM, which represented Brunei Darussalam in the Malaysian Super League. Mbuta was a pivotal player in the DPMM attack, playing either as an attacking midfielder or as a second striker. Following his impressive season in Malaysia, Mbuta had trial spells with Notts County

United States
In 2007 Mbuta moved to the United States to play for Crystal Palace Baltimore in the USL Second Division. In his first season with Baltimore he was named in the USL-2 All-League First-Team for scoring 5 goals in 16 games and also recording 7 assists. In his second season with Baltimore he was named in the USL-2 All-League Second-Team. His play with Crystal Palace Baltimore, especially during the 2008 US Open Cup where Mbuta faced Major League Soccer opposition, helped generate interest amongst the United States top-flight clubs.

Mbuta was signed by New York Red Bulls of Major League Soccer on 15 September 2008 and made his debut against Colorado Rapids on 27 September 2008, in which he managed to score a goal in the 5–4 loss. He was loaned to his old club Crystal Palace Baltimore in May 2009. The second time he scored for the Red Bulls was the last goal ever at Giants Stadium. He successfully converted a penalty kick in second half stoppage time to cap a 5–0 victory over Toronto FC in the 2009 regular season finale on 24 October.

He was released by New York prior to the 2010 season. Shortly thereafter he re-signed with Crystal Palace Baltimore. In March 2011, the club was dissolved.

Europe
During the 2011–12 season, Mbuta signed with FC Dinamo București in Romania. In April 2012 Mbuta signed with Syrianska of the Swedish top-flight Allsvenskan. His Nordic stay lasted only a few months and by summer 2012 he was out of contract.

Asia
Mbuta joined Army United F.C. of the Thai Premier League during the 2012–13 season. For the 2013-14 campaign, Mbuta signed with Duhok SC in the Iraqi Premier League.

Career statistics
(correct as of 26 September 2010)

References

External links

1985 births
Living people
People from Bamenda
Cameroonian footballers
Association football midfielders
New York Red Bulls players
Crystal Palace Baltimore players
DPMM FC players
Syrianska FC players
Matthew Mbuta
Duhok SC players
Major League Soccer players
USL Second Division players
Allsvenskan players
Matthew Mbuta
Cameroonian expatriate footballers
Cameroonian expatriate sportspeople in the United States
Cameroonian expatriate sportspeople in Sweden
Cameroonian expatriate sportspeople in Thailand
Cameroonian expatriate sportspeople in Iraq
Expatriate soccer players in the United States
Expatriate footballers in Brunei
Expatriate footballers in Sweden
Expatriate footballers in Thailand
Expatriate footballers in Iraq
Cameroon international footballers